Lyces ariaca is a moth of the family Notodontidae first described by Herbert Druce in 1885. It is found from southern Mexico to Honduras.

External links
Species page at Tree of Life Web Project

Notodontidae
Moths described in 1885